The 1964 All Ireland Camogie Championship was won by Dublin, their eight title in succession in a winning streak that would eventually extend to ten in a row, beating  Antrim in the final. The match was attended by more than 3,000 spectators according to the report in the Irish Times.

Semi-finals
Dublin beat the Connacht champions Galway by 10-2 to nil at Parnell Park on a day Galway were missing their goalkeeper Eileen Naughton. Antrim beat Munster champions Tipperary by 6-8 to 2-3 at Glenarriffe.

Final
Three early goals from Judy Doyle finished the match as a contest and Dublin won easily by 7-4 to 3-1. Agnes Hourigan wrote in the Irish Press: Despite the scoreline the final must rank with the greatest and most brilliant camogie matches ever played. Three early goals by their flying full forward Judy Doyle in the first seven minutes of the game proved the really vital factor in Dublin’s victory. Those early goals, all the result of crafty team-work by the experienced Dublin attack, hung heavy on the minds of the Antrim forwards for the rest of the first half. Although with the fresh breeze behind them, they had by far the greater number of chances, they often shot too hurriedly and too wildly and Concepta Clarke saved magnificently when they did shoot straight. The result was that, at the interval, Antrim had one point on the board and nine wides, while Dublin, thanks to that wonderful zig-zag solo run and flashing shot by captain Una O'Connor, and a rare piece of opportunism by Bríd Keenan, had stretched their goal total to five and their lead to fourteen points by the half-time whistle. Lesser teams than Antrim might well have accepted defeat at that stage, but the girls in saffron, having switched Lily Scullion to midfield and Maeve Gilroy to centre-forward, restarted as though the game had just begun.

Final stages

MATCH RULES
50 minutes
Replay if scores level
Maximum of 3 substitutions allowable only if player was injured

See also
 All-Ireland Senior Hurling Championship
 Wikipedia List of Camogie players
 National Camogie League
 Camogie All Stars Awards
 Ashbourne Cup

References

External links
 Official Camogie website
 History of Camogie senior championship slideshow. presented by Cumann Camógaíochta Communications Committee at GAA Museum January 25, 2010 part one, part two, part three and part four
 Historic newspaper reports of All Ireland finals
 Camogie on official GAA website
 Timeline: History of Camogie
 Camogie on GAA Oral History Project
 Camogie Websites for  Antrim and Dublin

1964
All-Ireland Senior Camogie Championship
All-Ireland Senior Camogie Championship
All-Ireland Senior Camogie Championship